Mary Rose Phillip (born 14 March 1977) is a former English international footballer and a football team manager who manages men's Kent County League team Peckham Town. A versatile player, she played in all four positions at the back and also in midfield. Phillip captained England, the first black player to captain an England women's international football team, and until 2011 was the only player to represent the country in two World Cup squads. During her playing career she had 65 international caps. She enjoyed a successful club career with Millwall Lionesses, Fulham, Arsenal and Chelsea. After retiring as a player in 2008 she became a team coach and manager and in 2020 became the first female manager of a cup-winning men's senior side.

Early life
Phillip was born and raised in Peckham and is biracial. Her father was a bus driver of Saint Lucian descent, and her mother was a primary school teacher of Irish origin. Phillip was keen on football from childhood.

Career

Club career
Phillip joined Millwall Lionesses as a 12-year-old, then moved to Fulham as a professional in 2000; she was one of the first 16 UK women players to turn pro.

Phillip became the club captain at Fulham, for whom she lifted The FA Women’s Cup in front of 10,000 fans and 1.9m viewers on BBC Television in May 2003, the season Fulham completed the treble.

Phillip’s strength and composure at the heart of defence brought reassurance to her teammates and she was always on hand to provide some advice to the younger members of the squad.

She was a strong player for Arsenal Ladies in central defence and was with the club for four years after joining from Fulham Ladies in July 2004. Her central defensive partnership with Faye White was key to Arsenal's unprecedented success, both domestically and in Europe. At the end of the 2007–08 season it was announced that Phillip would be leaving Arsenal Ladies. She later joined Chelsea Ladies in time for the start of the 2008–09 season. In October 2008 Phillip retired from football at the age of 31.

International career
Phillip made her England debut whilst with Millwall Lionesses, playing in the same team as current national coach Hope Powell in 1996. As an 18-year-old she received an unexpected call-up to the 1995 World Cup squad; she was pregnant at the time. Phillip won six caps then spent four years (1998–2002) out of the international set-up while having her two sons.

She returned in early 2002 and subsequently captained England in two international friendlies against Sweden in February 2006 when Faye White was absent with an ankle injury, then again captained England in the absence of her teammate Faye White, who suffered a cruciate ligament injury at the start of the 2006/07 season, when they overcame France to secure passage to the World Cup in China. She was the first black player to captain an England women's international side.

After being named in the squad for China, Phillip became the first English player to feature in two World Cup squads. In February 2008 Phillip was one of a record eight Arsenal players who started in England's 2–1 friendly win over Norway. She won a total of 65 caps for the national side.

Coach and manager
After her retirement as a player in 2008, Phillip became a coach, completing her A licence in the 2010s. In 2019 she became manager of Peckham Town, her local club, where she had coached first the Under-18s and then the senior squad; in 2020 they won the London Senior Trophy, the club's first cup win and the first for a senior men's side with a female manager. In 2021, she will be assisting Lydia Bedford in coaching the England women's Under-18 team as part of the Elite Coach Placement Programme.

Honours

Player
Arsenal
Women's Premier League: 2004–05, 2005–06, 2006–07, 2007–08
UEFA Women's Cup: 2006–07
FA Cup: 2004–05, 2005–06, 2006–07, 2007–08
Premier League Cup: 2004–05, 2006–07
Community Shield: 2005–06

Fulham
Women's Premier League: 2002–03
FA Cup: 2001–02, 2002–03
Premier League Cup: 2000–01, 2001–02, 2002–03
Community Shield: 2002–03, 2003–04

Millwall Lionesses
FA Cup: 1996–97
Premier League Cup: 1996–97

Manager
Peckham Town
London Senior Cup: 2019–20

Personal life
Phillip has two sons and two daughters. She has multiple sclerosis, diagnosed in 2017.

References

External links
Mary Phillip at The FA website

1977 births
Living people
English women's footballers
England women's international footballers
English people of Saint Lucian descent
English people of Irish descent
Black British sportswomen
Millwall Lionesses L.F.C. players
Fulham L.F.C. players
Arsenal W.F.C. players
Chelsea F.C. Women players
FA Women's National League players
1995 FIFA Women's World Cup players
2007 FIFA Women's World Cup players
Women's association football defenders
English football managers
Footballers from Peckham